Valaghuz may refer to:
 Valaghuz, Golestan
 Valaghuz, Mazandaran